Archbishop Hubert Coppenrath (18 October 1930 – 31 July 2022) was a French Polynesian Roman Catholic prelate, who served as Archbishop of the Roman Catholic Archdiocese of Papeete.

Biography
Coppenrath was born in Papeete, Tahiti, French Polynesia. He was ordained as a Roman Catholic priest on 27 June 1957, in Tahiti. Coppenrath was an advocate for the Tahitian language and in 1974 he became one of the founding members of the Tahitian Academy. He was formally ordained as the Archbishop of the Roman Catholic Archdiocese of Papeete on 4 June 1999 after appointment by Pope John Paul II. He succeeded his own brother, Michel-Gaspard Coppenrath, as Archbishop. On 31 March 2011 Pope Benedict XVI accepted the resignation of Coppenrath from the pastoral care of the archdiocese having reached the age limit.

In June 2020 he was appointed an Officer of the Order of Tahiti Nui.

References

External links

Hubert Coppenrath at Catholic Hierarchy

1930 births
2022 deaths
French Polynesian Roman Catholic archbishops
Roman Catholic archbishops of Papeete
Tahitian-language writers
21st-century Roman Catholic archbishops in Oceania
21st-century Roman Catholic archbishops in France
Officers of the Order of Tahiti Nui
People from Papeete
Members of the Tahitian Academy